Morris Woodrow Aderholt (September 13, 1915 – March 18, 1955) was a second baseman and outfielder in Major League Baseball from 1939 to 1945.

Born in Mount Olive, North Carolina, Aderholt graduated from Wake Forest University and played professional ball for the Washington Senators, Brooklyn Dodgers and Boston Braves from 1939 to 1945. He played a total of 106 games in the major leagues over the five seasons he was active.

Aderholt made his professional debut for Washington on September 13, 1939, which happened to also fall on his 24th birthday.  On that occasion, he ended up hitting a home run and a single against the Chicago White Sox.  Through August 29, 2019, Aderholt is the only major league baseball player to have multiple hits — and the only one to hit a homer — in their pro debut, which was also the player's birthday.

Aderholt was described by Dodgers President Branch Rickey as the "World's worst third baseman... but he's a natural batsman." He was thus moved to the outfield, where he would be less of a defensive liability.

After his playing career ended, he went on to manage several minor league teams and also served as a scout for the Senators. Aderholt died on March 18, 1955, after suffering a heart attack during a scouting trip to Sarasota, Florida.

References

External links

1915 births
1955 deaths
Atlanta Crackers players
Baseball players from North Carolina
Birmingham Barons players
Boston Braves players
Brooklyn Dodgers players
Charlotte Hornets (baseball) players
Chattanooga Lookouts players
Emporia Nationals players
Indianapolis Indians players
Major League Baseball outfielders
Minor league baseball managers
Montgomery Rebels players
Montreal Royals players
People from Mount Olive, North Carolina
Roanoke Rapids Jays players
Wake Forest University alumni
Springfield Nationals players
Toronto Maple Leafs (International League) players
Washington Senators (1901–1960) players
Washington Senators (1901–60) scouts